Freehold Raceway is a half-mile racetrack in Freehold Borough, New Jersey, and is the oldest racetrack in the United States. Horseraces have been taking place at Freehold Raceway since the 1830s. The Monmouth County Agricultural Society was formed on December 17, 1853, and in 1854 they began holding an annual fair with harness racing at Freehold Raceway

From 1998 to 2010, Freehold Raceway was the home of the Cane Pace, a harness horse race run annually since 1955. In 1956 the race joined with the Little Brown Jug and the Messenger Stakes to become the first leg in the Triple Crown of Harness Racing for Pacers.

In 1984, an electrical fire destroyed the main building. Racing was then held under tents until the new building was completed in 1986.

In 1990, the Freehold Raceway Mall opened up across the street, and was, until 2007, decorated with harness racing motif.

In 1998, Freehold was acquired by a joint venture of Penn National Gaming (now Penn Entertainment) and Greenwood Racing (owner of Parx Casino and Racing).

In 2005, Freehold was also the temporary home of the Yonkers Trot, part of the Triple Crown of Harness Racing for Trotters, while renovations took place at Yonkers Raceway.

Freehold Raceway has two meets per year.  They race from New Years Day until the end of May, then reopen in September and race until the middle of December.  There are two harness tracks in New Jersey, Freehold Raceway and The Meadowlands. There are several farms and training centers located near Freehold Raceway which stable hundreds of standardbred racehorses.

Triple Dead Heat 

Freehold Raceway was the site of the first ever photo finish triple dead heat win in a harness race.  Double, triple and even quadruple dead heats were more commonly awarded in horse racing when finishes were judged by the naked eye in real time.  With the advent of photo finish technology in the second quarter of the 20th century, there was a significant decrease in dead heats.

During a harness race on October 3, 1953, the noses of horses Patchover (driven by Ed Myer), Payne Hall (F. Albertson) and Penny Maid (E. Beede) passed the finish line at exactly the same time.

See also

Gambling in New Jersey

References

External links 
Freehold Raceway Official Site

Buildings and structures in Monmouth County, New Jersey
Freehold Borough, New Jersey
Harness racing venues in the United States
Horse racing venues in New Jersey
Sports venues in New Jersey
Tourist attractions in Monmouth County, New Jersey
1830s establishments in New Jersey